Gillsvannet or Gjelsvannet is a freshwater lake in the municipality of Kristiansand in Agder county, Norway. There is a practice range for kayaking on the lake as well as many areas used for swimming during the summer season. The Gimlekollen district lies on the southern shore of the lake and the village of Justvik lies just north of the lake.

See also
List of lakes in Norway

References

External links
 Kristiansand Gillsvannet  Kristiansand Kajakk Klubb 

Geography of Kristiansand
Lakes of Agder